The sand smelt (Atherina presbyter) is a species of marine fish of the family Atherinidae, common in the northeastern Atlantic from the Danish straits, where it is rare, and Scotland to the Canary Islands and the western Mediterranean Sea. Sand smelt are small, pelagic fishes which are found in  coastal areas and in estuaries. They are a schooling species which undertake seasonal migrations in the Atlantic. They are carnivorous and prey on small crustaceans and fish larvae. Reproduction takes place in the spring and summer, in the North Sea and the English Channel spawning takes place over midsummer.

Sand smelt generally live in semi-isolated populations around river estuaries. A population living around the entrance to Southampton water was found to spawn in the April–June period within inshore algae beds before moving out into the deeper waters of the Solent.

The small size of the sand smelt means it often unable to escape being drawn onto screens used to remove fish and weed from power station cooling water intake and in the case of the Southampton water population it was the species most commonly found on the Fawley Power Station screens.

References

Atherina
Fish of the Atlantic Ocean
Fish of the Mediterranean Sea
Fish of the North Sea
Fish of Europe
Fish described in 1829
Taxa named by Georges Cuvier